Long Beach, California, held an election for Mayor of Long Beach, California, on April 11, 2006 and June 6, 2006. It saw the election of Bob Foster.

Results

First round

Runoff

References 

Long Beach
Mayoral elections in Long Beach, California
Long Beach